Jill Schwikert (born May 19, 1954) is an American former professional tennis player.

Schwikert is a native of Las Vegas and turned professional in 1972 after graduating high school. She played a lot of doubles with twin sister Joy and the pair were quarter-finalists at the 1974 Australian Open. In 1974 she also appeared in the mixed doubles main draw at Wimbledon and made the second round.

Her niece, Tasha Schwikert (daughter of Joy), is a retired Olympic gymnast.

References

External links
 
 

1954 births
Living people
American female tennis players
Twin sportspeople
American twins
Tennis people from Nevada
Sportspeople from Las Vegas